The Hummocks or Hummock Range is a range of hills in the northern Mount Lofty Ranges extending north from the eastern edge of Yorke Peninsula in South Australia. It is traversed by the Copper Coast Highway immediately west of where it passes around the northern end of Gulf St Vincent. The Augusta Highway passes to the east of the Hummocks. The Hummock Range includes the settlements of South Hummocks and Kulpara.

The Hummocks is a primary source of catchment for Lake Bumbunga near Lochiel.

The Hummocks and Barunga ranges are host to the Snowtown wind farm.

References

Mountain ranges of South Australia
Geology of South Australia
Mid North (South Australia)
Yorke Peninsula